Reticunassa cockburnensis is a species of sea snail, a marine gastropod mollusk in the family Nassariidae, the Nassa mud snails or dog whelks.

Description
The length of the shell varies between 6.9 mm and 9.7 mm.

Distribution
This marine species occurs off Western Australia.

References

 Kool H.H. & Dekker H. (2006) Review of the Nassarius pauper (Gould, 1850) complex (Gastropoda: Nassariidae). Part 1, with the description of four new species from the Indo-West Pacific. Visaya 1(6): 54–75. page(s): 57

External links
 Galindo L.A., Kool H.H. & Dekker H. (2017). Review of the Nassarius pauperus (Gould, 1850) complex (Nassariidae): Part 3, reinstatement of the genus Reticunassa, with the description of six new species. European Journal of Taxonomy. 275: 1-43.

Nassariidae
Gastropods described in 2006